Para Toda La Vida (For All Life) is a studio album released by Spanish performer Rocío Dúrcal on February 23, 1999 by BMG Ariola. This would be the second album written, and produced by Argentinian songwriter Roberto Livi for the singer.

Its lead single "Para Toda La Vida" became a hit all over Latin America and in the United States where it peaked at number 10 on the Billboard Latin Pop Airplay. In this year the singer receives the award TV y Novelas (Special recognition for being the ambassador of the Song Ranchera Worldwide) and the Award Hall of Fame, presented by the American journal Billboard (Special recognition for his musical career).

Track listing

Awards 

TV y Novelas – Special recognition for being the ambassador of the Song Ranchera Worldwide.
Hall of Fame (Billboard) – Special recognition for his musical career.

Charts 
 Billboard Singles 

 Billboard Albums

Certifications 
 Certifications

Credits and personnel 
Musicians
 Rocío Dúrcal – (Vocals)
 Kathleen Melgarejo – (Chorus).
 George Noriega – (Chorus).
 Wendy Peterson – (Chorus).
 Jeannie Cross – (Chorus).
 Grant Geissman – (Guitar).
 Pedro Iniguez – (Accordion).
 Ramon Flores – (Trumpet).
 Gary Grant, Jerry Hey, Larry Williams, Frank William "Bill" Reichenbach Jr. – (Brass).
 Julian "Pelusa" Navarro – 
 Arranger, Musical Director, 
 (Piano Synths, programming).
 Lee Levin – (Drums).
 Richard Bravo – (Percussion).
 Los Angeles Strings – (Set).

Production
 Direction and Production: Roberto Livi.
 Arranger: Julian Navarro.
 Engineers: Mike Couzzi, Ted Stein, Shawn Michael, JC Ulloa.
 Assistant Engineer: Chris Carroll and Juan Rosario.
 Production management: Juan Mardi.
 Coordinator of art: Antonio Morales.
 Photographer: Cesar Vera.
 Contributing: Gary Grant, Grant Geissman, Jerry Hey, Larry Williams, Julian Navarro, Lee Levin, Pedro Iñiguez, Rafael Basurto, Richard Bravo, Ramon Flores, Frank William "Bill" Reichenbach Jr.
 Audio Mixer: Mike Couzzi.
 Recorded In Studies: Criteria Recording Studios, Miami, Martin Sound, Los Angeles.
 Label: BMG Music, Ariola International, Sony Music (CD) and RCA (Cassette).
 Manufactured And Distributed By: BMG Ariola and RCA International.

References 

1999 albums
Rocío Dúrcal albums